INSC may refer to:

 International Nathiagali Summer College on Physics
 International Nuclear Safety Center
 International Nuclear Societies Council
 inscuteable (INSC) protein, see NFIX
 National Security Council (Iraq)